Forgotten Sins is a 1996 American drama television film directed by Dick Lowry and written by T. S. Cook. It is based on Lawrence Wright's two-part article "Remembering Satan", about the real-life case of Paul Ingram, which appeared in the May 17 and May 24, 1993 issues of The New Yorker.  It originally aired on ABC on March 7, 1996.

It stars William Devane as Richard Ofshe, "a role to which William Devane brings his customary bristling panache" wrote Dorothy Rabinowitz in the Wall Street Journal.  John Shea also stars as Matthew Bradshaw, a fictional character based on Paul Ingram. Bess Armstrong portrays Roberta 'Bobbie' Bradshaw, a character based on Sandy Ingram.  Doogie Howser's Lisa Dean Ryan co-stars.

Notes

External links 
 
 Ingram case (basis for the movie)

1996 television films
1996 films
1996 drama films
1990s American films
1990s English-language films
ABC network original films
American drama television films
American films based on actual events
Films based on newspaper and magazine articles
Drama films based on actual events
Films directed by Dick Lowry
Films scored by Mark Snow
Television films based on actual events